Han Xinyun and Zhang Kailin were the defending champions, but lost in the semifinals.

The top seeds Xu Yifan and Zheng Saisai won the title, defeating Yang Zhaoxuan and Ye Qiuyu in an all-Chinese final, 7–5, 6–2.

Seeds

Draw

References 
 Draw

Anning Open - Doubles